Suelton Marques de Souza (born ) is a Brazilian futsal player who plays for Copagril and the Brazilian national futsal team as a winger.

References

External links
Liga Nacional de Futsal profile
The Final Ball profile

1991 births
Living people
Brazilian men's futsal players